The 1998 World Weightlifting Championships were held in Lahti, Finland from November 10 to November 15, 1998.

Medal summary

Men

Women

Medal table
Ranking by Big (Total result) medals 

Ranking by all medals: Big (Total result) and Small (Snatch and Clean & Jerk)

Team ranking

Men

Women

Participating nations
332 competitors from 55 nations competed.

 (3)
 (2)
 (5)
 (8)
 (1)
 (6)
 (4)
 (2)
 (12)
 (2)
 (15)
 (15)
 (11)
 (8)
 (6)
 (2)
 (4)
 (4)
 (2)
 (12)
 (15)
 (12)
 (2)
 (11)
 (7)
 (13)
 (15)
 (2)
 (5)
 (10)
 (7)
 (2)
 (6)
 (1)
 (1)
 (2)
 (10)
 (4)
 (1)
 (3)
 (1)
 (12)
 (1)
 (6)
 (10)
 (5)
 (2)
 (9)
 (2)
 (1)
 (9)
 (3)
 (6)
 (7)
 (5)

References
Results (Sport 123)
IWF Archive
Weightlifting World Championships Seniors Statistics 

 
Weightlifting
World Weightlifting Championships
1998 in Finnish sport